Tetraevangelion ("Four Evangelia/Gospel Books"; , ot'kht'avi; Old Slavonic: благовѣствованиѥ;) is a name used in Eastern Orthodox terminology for the Canonical gospels of the Four Evangelists. Examples of notable medieval manuscripts include:

Gospels of Tsar Ivan Alexander (1355–56), Bulgarian, illuminated.
Jakov of Serres' (1354), Serbian, illuminated.
Vani Gospels (12–13th c.), Georgian, illuminated.
Mstislav Gospel (12th c.), Russian, illuminated.
Codex Marianus (11th c.), South Slavic. One of the oldest Slavic tetraevangelia.
Codex Zographensis (10–11th c.), South Slavic, illuminated. Oldest Slavic tetraevangelion.

References

Sources

Eastern Orthodoxy
Canonical Gospels
Greek words and phrases